The Gunston Baronetcy, of Wickwar in the County of Gloucester, is a title in the Baronetage of the United Kingdom. It was created on 1 February 1938 for Derrick Gunston, Conservative member of parliament for Thornbury from 1924 to 1945.

Gunston baronets, of Wickwar (1938)
Sir Derrick Wellesley Gunston, 1st Baronet (1891–1985)
Sir Richard Wellesley Gunston, 2nd Baronet (1924–1991)
Sir John Wellesley Gunston, 3rd Baronet (born 1962)

References
Notes

Sources
Kidd, Charles, Williamson, David (editors). Debrett's Peerage and Baronetage (1990 edition). New York: St Martin's Press, 1990.

Gunston